Snead State Community College is a public community college in Boaz, Alabama. It began as a private seminary in 1898 and became part of the Alabama Community College System in 1967.  Snead awards associate degrees in 79 programs and certificates in 24 programs.

History
Snead began in 1898 as a grade school for girls in the house of its founder, Anna D. Elder.  Oversight of the school was transferred to the state conference of the Methodist Episcopal Church later that year.  By 1901, enrollment necessitated the construction of a separate building, allowing the addition of a high school.  In 1906, local businessman John H. Snead donated land and money to the school, and it was renamed in his honor.  After the city of Boaz built a public high school, Snead expanded to add a junior college in 1935; the primary and high schools were phased out three years later.  The junior college gained accreditation from the Southern Association of Colleges and Schools in 1941.  When the Alabama Community College System was created in 1963, enrollment at Snead suffered, and in 1967, the System acquired Snead, which became the 15th college in the system.

Campus
The historic core of campus forms the Snead Junior College Historic District, which was listed on the Alabama Register of Landmarks and Heritage in 1998 and the National Register of Historic Places in 1999.

References

External links

Community colleges in Alabama
National Register of Historic Places in Marshall County, Alabama
Historic districts in Marshall County, Alabama
Educational institutions established in 1898
Neoclassical architecture in Alabama
Universities and colleges accredited by the Southern Association of Colleges and Schools
Properties on the Alabama Register of Landmarks and Heritage
Colonial Revival architecture in Alabama
Education in Marshall County, Alabama
Historic districts on the National Register of Historic Places in Alabama
NJCAA athletics
1898 establishments in Alabama